Sukhoverkovo is an urban locality (an urban-type settlement) in Kalininsky District of Tver Oblast, Russia, located approximately  southwest of the city of Tver. Population:

History
Sukhoverkovo was founded as a settlement serving a peat extraction plant. The name originates from the village of Sukhoverkovo, which was first mentioned in the end of the 19th century and was located in the area. In the 2000s, more than the half of the population of the settlement were retirees.

Economy

Industry
The peat extraction plant went bankrupt in the 1990s. The only two industrial enterprises in Sukhoverkovo are a factory producing fish products and a curb production factory.

Transportation
Sukhoverkovo has access to roads which connect Tver with Rzhev and with Lotoshino. There is infrequent bus traffic connecting Sukhoverkovo and Tver.

References

Notes

Sources

Urban-type settlements in Tver Oblast